The Cenotaph, in Regina, Saskatchewan, was built in honour Regina's fallen heroes of World War I. The cenotaph replaced the fountain that honoured Nicholas Flood Davin, which had stood in Victoria Park since 1908. The Cenotaph was unveiled on November 11, 1926. A rededication was held in 1990 to honour those Regina citizens who served in World War II and the Korean War and inscription was added to the monument.

See also

References

Buildings and structures in Regina, Saskatchewan
Monuments and memorials in Saskatchewan
Cultural infrastructure completed in 1926
Cenotaphs in Canada
World War I memorials in Canada
World War II memorials in Canada
1926 sculptures